Abraham "Bram" Eldering (8 July 1865 – 17 June 1943) was a Dutch violinist and music pedagogue.

Life 
Born in Groningen, Bram (abbreviation of Abraham) Eldering studied violin with Jenő Hubay at the Royal Conservatory of Brussels. After his appointment to the Franz Liszt Academy of Music in Budapest, he followed his teacher in 1886. With Victor von Herzfeld and David Popper he played in Hubay's String quartet. In 1888 he moved to Berlin to continue his studies with Joseph Joachim.

In 1893 he was concertmaster of the Berlin Philharmonic under Hans von Bülow.

In 1894, after von Bülow's death, he became concertmaster of the Meiningen Court Orchestra, of which he was a member until 1899. At the invitation of the industrialist family Weyermann, he took part with other members of the orchestra in an intimate chamber music festival at  near Bad Honnef at Whitsun 1896 and took part in the performance of Robert Schumann's String Quartet in A major and Johannes Brahms's Piano quintet F-minor - with Brahms at the piano.

In 1899 he was appointed as a docent at the Conservatorium van Amsterdam.

One of his students was Theo Giesen, who later became first concertmaster of the Gürzenich Orchestra Cologne, then founding member and first concertmaster of the Cologne Radio Symphony Orchestra (KRSO) later called WDR Symphony Orchestra Cologne.

He also became first violinist in the Gürzenich Quartet founded by Gustav Hollaender in 1888, to which Carl Körner, Josef Schwartz and  belonged. As the Bram-Eldering Quartet, the ensemble achieved world fame. After the death of Friedrich Grützmacher in 1919, Emanuel Feuermann took over the cello part.

Along with his Amsterdam successor Carl Flesch, with whom he had written correspondence, he was one of the most influential violin teachers of his time. Among his students were Ernst-Lothar von Knorr, Adolf Busch, Hans-Ludwig Schilling, Max Strub, Siegfried Borries, Hans Raderschatt, Quirin Rische and Wilhelm Stross.

Work 
 Konzert des Gürzenich-Quartett Dienstag, den 16. Februar 1909, abends 8 Uhr ; [Programm:] A. Dvorák: Quartett F-dur op. 96. Ludwig van Beethoven: Quartett A-dur op. 18. Franz Schubert: Quartett G-dur op. 161.
 Kadenzen : zum Mozart-Violin-Konzert G-Dur.

Literature 
 
 Willi Kahl: Bram Eldering, in MGG (1949–86), vol. 3, 
 Berliner Philharmoniker: Variationen mit Orchester – 125 Jahre Berliner Philharmoniker, vol. 2, Biografien und Konzerte, Verlag Henschel, May 2007,

References

External links 
 
 

1865 births
1943 deaths
People from Gröningen
Dutch classical violinists
Concertmasters
Dutch music educators
Academic staff of the Hochschule für Musik und Tanz Köln
Dutch civilians killed in World War II
Deaths by airstrike during World War II
Dutch expatriates in Germany
Royal Conservatory of Brussels alumni
Franz Liszt Academy of Music alumni